Schloßstraße is a Berlin U-Bahn station located on the .

With its visible concrete walls partially covered by dark blue, orange and yellow plastic panels, Schloßstraße is an example of the 1970s pop-art design. Opened in 1974 by Schüler/Witte, it was planned to be a transfer station between U9 and the to-be-built . However, there is no current plan to establish the U10.

References 

U9 (Berlin U-Bahn) stations
Buildings and structures in Steglitz-Zehlendorf
Railway stations in Germany opened in 1974